In computer science, a longest common substring of two or more strings is a longest string that is a substring of all of them. There may be more than one longest common substring. Applications include data deduplication and plagiarism detection.

Examples

The picture shows two strings where the problem has multiple solutions. Although the substring occurrences always overlap, no longer common substring can be obtained by "uniting" them.

The strings "ABABC", "BABCA" and "ABCBA" have only one longest common substring, viz. "ABC" of length 3. Other common substrings are "A", "AB", "B", "BA", "BC" and "C".

   ABABC
     |||
    BABCA
     |||
     ABCBA

Problem definition

A generalization is the k-common substring problem. Find for each , a longest string which occurs as substring of at least  strings.

Algorithms
In particular, this algorithm runs in  time using  space. Solving the problem by dynamic programming costs . The solutions to the generalized problem take  space and ·...· time with dynamic programming and take  time with a generalized suffix tree.

Suffix tree

The longest common substrings of a set of strings can be found by building a generalized suffix tree for the strings, and then finding the deepest internal nodes which have leaf nodes from all the strings in the subtree below it. The figure on the right is the suffix tree for the strings "ABAB", "BABA" and "ABBA", padded with unique string terminators, to become "ABAB$0", "BABA$1" and "ABBA$2". The nodes representing "A", "B", "AB" and "BA" all have descendant leaves from all of the strings, numbered 0, 1 and 2.

Building the suffix tree takes  time (if the size of the alphabet is constant). If the tree is traversed from the bottom up with a bit vector telling which strings are seen below each node, the k-common substring problem can be solved in  time. If the suffix tree is prepared for constant time lowest common ancestor retrieval, it can be solved in  time.

Dynamic programming
The following pseudocode finds the set of longest common substrings between two strings with dynamic programming:

 function LongestCommonSubstring(S[1..r], T[1..n])
     L := array(1..r, 1..n)
     z := 0
     ret := {}
 
     for i := 1..r
         for j := 1..n
             if S[i] = T[j]
                 if i = 1 or j = 1
                     L[i, j] := 1
                 else
                     L[i, j] := L[i − 1, j − 1] + 1
                 if L[i, j] > z
                     z := L[i, j]
                     ret := {S[i − z + 1..i]}
                 else if L[i, j] = z
                     ret := ret ∪ {S[i − z + 1..i]}
             else
                 L[i, j] := 0
     return ret

This algorithm runs in  time. The array L stores the longest common substring of the prefixes S[1..i] and T[1..j] which end at position S[i], T[j], resp. The variable z is used to hold the length of the longest common substring found so far. The set ret is used to hold the set of strings which are of length z. The set ret can be saved efficiently by just storing the index i, which is the last character of the longest common substring (of size z) instead of S[i-z+1..i]. Thus all the longest common substrings would be, for each i in ret, S[(ret[i]-z)..(ret[i])].

The following tricks can be used to reduce the memory usage of an implementation:
 Keep only the last and current row of the DP table to save memory ( instead of )
 The last and current row can be stored on the same 1D array by traversing the inner loop backwards
 Store only non-zero values in the rows. This can be done using hash-tables instead of arrays. This is useful for large alphabets.

See also
 Longest palindromic substring
 n-gram, all the possible substrings of length n that are contained in a string

References

External links

 Dictionary of Algorithms and Data Structures: longest common substring
 Perl/XS implementation of the dynamic programming algorithm
 Perl/XS implementation of the suffix tree algorithm
 Dynamic programming implementations in various languages on wikibooks
 working AS3 implementation of the dynamic programming algorithm
 Suffix Tree based C implementation of Longest common substring for two strings

Problems on strings
Dynamic programming
Articles with example pseudocode